Melrose is an unincorporated community in Neosho Township of Cherokee County, Kansas, United States, and has an elevation of .  It contains one church, the Melrose United Methodist Church.

History    
A post office was opened in Melrose in 1877, and remained in operation until it was discontinued in 1905.

References

Further reading

External links
 Cherokee County maps: Current, Historic, KDOT

Unincorporated communities in Cherokee County, Kansas
Unincorporated communities in Kansas